Art Objects may refer to:

 Work of art, an aesthetic physical item or artistic creation
 Art Objects (band), a Bristol-based post-punk band